Cezar Baltag (26 July 1939 in Mălineşti-Hotin – 26 May 1997 in Bucharest) was a Romanian poet.

Selected works

Vis planetar (1962),
Răsfrângeri (1966), 
Monada (1968), 
Odihnă în ţipăt (1969), 
Şah orb (1970), 
Madona din dud (1973), 
Unicorn în oglindă (1975), 
Poeme (1981),
Dialog la mal (1985), 
Euridice şi umbra (1988),
Chemarea numelui (1995),
Ochii tăcerii (1996)

External links
Telegraph online 

1937 births
1997 deaths
People from Chernivtsi Oblast
20th-century Romanian poets
Romanian male poets
International Writing Program alumni
20th-century Romanian male writers